Pioneer Warehouse is an historic 1918 building, located at 311 4th Avenue, in San Diego, California. The warehouse was being converted into apartments in 1990.

See also
 List of Gaslamp Quarter historic buildings

References

External links

 

1918 establishments in California
Buildings and structures completed in 1918
Buildings and structures in San Diego
Gaslamp Quarter, San Diego
Warehouses in the United States